Hans Leip (22 September 1893 – 6 June 1983), was a German novelist, poet and playwright, best remembered as the lyricist of Lili Marleen.

Leip was the son of a former sailor and harbour-worker at the port of Hamburg. He was educated there, and in 1914 became a teacher in the Hamburg suburb of Rothenburgsort. In 1915 he was called up by the German army and after training in Berlin served on the Eastern front and in the Carpathians. After being wounded in 1917 he was discharged on medical grounds.

He first had ambitions as an artist, but then turned to writing, although he illustrated his books himself. In the 1920s, he travelled extensively, to Paris, London, Algiers and New York City, among other places. His breakthrough as a novelist was with the success of Godekes Knecht, which was awarded the prize of the  newspaper. His novels sold well in the years leading up to the outbreak of World War II, while he also wrote plays, short stories, poems, dramas and was also a painter and sculptor.

"Lili Marleen"
Leip wrote the words while serving in the army during World War I.  The poem was originally titled "Das Mädchen unter der Laterne" (German for "The Girl under the Lantern"). He reportedly combined the nickname of his girlfriend with that of a nurse. The poem was later published as "Das Lied eines jungen Soldaten auf der Wacht" ("The Song of a Young Soldier on Watch") in 1937, now with the two last (of five) verses added by Leip. It was set to music by Norbert Schultze in 1938. Tommie Connor later wrote English lyrics. It was recorded by Lale Andersen in 1939 and subsequently, in many translations, became a worldwide hit.

References

External links
The Official Lili Marleen Page
Lili Marleen by Lale Anderson on Internet Archive
Site in German about Hans Leip (archived)

1893 births
1983 deaths
Writers from Hamburg
German male poets
German male dramatists and playwrights
German songwriters
20th-century German dramatists and playwrights
20th-century German poets
German male novelists
20th-century German novelists
German Army personnel of World War I
German-language poets
20th-century German male writers